Pongani is a village on the north coast of Papua New Guinea in Dyke Ackland Bay, Oro Province.

History
During World War II, the area around the village was used as a staging area for allied forces for the Battle of Buna-Gona. The United States 126th Infantry Regiment and 128th Infantry Regiment of the 32nd Infantry Division together with Australian 2/6th Independent Company staged in Pongani before heading towards offensives in Buna, Sanananda  and Gona.

A US Army supply dump was constructed in the area and was used for supplies coming via sea, and later after Pongani Airfield was built, by air.

References
Pongani

Populated places in Oro Province